Morphoses is a ballet company, co-founded in 2007 by Christopher Wheeldon and Lourdes Lopez. Morphoses is a guest resident company at the New York City Center and at Sadler's Wells Theatre in London. It was known as Morphoses/The Wheeldon Company until February 2010, when Wheeldon announced that he was leaving the company.

Productions

City Center, October 1–5, 2008

program one, October 1–3

Polyphonia 

Christopher Wheeldon’s choreography
Ligeti's eponymous music
costumes by Holly Hynes
lighting by Mark Stanley
  
Wendy Whelan
Tiler Peck
Beatriz Stix-Brunell
Teresa Reichlen

Tyler Angle
Gonzalo Garcia
Craig Hall
Jason Fowler

Monotones II 

Frederick Ashton’s choreography
Satie's Trois Gymnopédie
costumes and lighting by Ashton
  
Maria Kowroski

Rubinald Pronk
Edward Watson

Commedia 

Christopher Wheeldon’s choreography
Stravinsky’s Pulcinella Suite
costumes by Isabel Toledo
sets by Ruben Toledo
lighting by Penny Jacobus
  
Leanne Benjamin
Beatriz Stix-Brunell
Céline Cassone
Drew Jacoby

Rory Hohenstein
Edwaard Liang
Rubinald Pronk
Edward Watson

Six Fold Illuminate 

Emily Molnar's choreography
Reich's Variations for Winds, Strings and Keyboards
costumes by Narciso Rodriguez
lighting by Pierre Lavoie
  
Drew Jacoby
Céline Cassone
*Edwaard Liang
Edward Watson
Rubinald Pronk
Rory Hohenstein

program two, October 4–5

Commedia 

Christopher Wheeldon’s choreography
Stravinsky’s Pulcinella Suite
costumes by Isabel Toledo
sets by Ruben Toledo
lighting by Penny Jacobus
  
Leanne Benjamin
Beatriz Stix-Brunell
Céline Cassone
Drew Jacoby

Rory Hohenstein
Edwaard Liang
Rubinald Pronk
Edward Watson

One 

Annabelle Lopez Ochoa's choreography
Jacob Ter Vedhuis' music
costumes by Benjamin Briones
lighting by Lopez Ochoa
  
Drew Jacoby

Rubinald Pronk

Monotones II 

Frederick Ashton’s choreography
Satie's Trois Gymnopédie
costumes and lighting by Ashton
  
Wendy Whelan

Tyler Angle
Adrian Danchig-Waring

Shutters Shut 

Lightfoot León's choreography
text by Gertrude Stein
costumes and lighting by Lightfoot León
  
Christine Thomassen

Andreas Heise

Fools’ Paradise 

Christopher Wheeldon’s choreography
music by Joby Talbot, adapted for string orchestra from his score for the British Film Institute's release of silent film The Dying Swan
costumes by Narciso Rodriguez
lighting by Penny Jacobus
  
Wendy Whelan
Maria Kowroski
Teresa Reichlen
Tiler Peck
Céline Cassone

Craig Hall
Edwaard Liang
Adrian Danchig-Waring
Gonzalo Garcia

Guggenheim Museum, March 8–9, 2009

Commedia 

Christopher Wheeldon’s choreography
Stravinsky's music

Fall for Dance, September–October 2009

Softly as I Leave You 

Lightfoot León’s choreography
Pärt and Bach's music
  
Drew Jacoby

Rubinald Pronk

City Center, October 29,  – November 1, 2009

program one, Thursday and Saturday, October 29 and 31 

 accompanied by the Philharmonic Orchestra of the Americas

Commedia 

Christopher Wheeldon’s choreography
Stravinsky's music

Softly as I Leave You 

Lightfoot León's choreography
Pärt and Bach's music
  
Drew Jacoby

Rubinald Pronk

Bolero 

Alexei Ratmansky’s choreography
Ravel's music

new Harbour ballet 

Tim Harbour’s choreography 
Edwards' music

program two, Friday and Sunday, October 30 and November 1 

all piano program

Continuum 

Christopher Wheeldon’s choreography
Ligeti's music

Softly as I Leave You 

Lightfoot León’s choreography
Pärt and Bach's music

new Wheeldon ballet 

Christopher Wheeldon’s choreography 
Rachmaninoff's music

notes

Dancers

2008 New York City Center 

  
Beatriz Stix-Brunell
Céline Cassone
Christine Thomassen 
Drew Jacoby
Leanne Benjamin
Maria Kowroski
Teresa Reichlen
Tiler Peck
Wendy Whelan

Adrian Danchig-Waring
Andreas Heise 
Craig Hall
Edwaard Liang
Edward Watson
Gonzalo Garcia
Jason Fowler
Rory Hohenstein
Rubinald Pronk
Tyler Angle

notes

2009 Fall for Dance 

  
 Drew Jacoby

 Rubinald Pronk

2009 New York City Center 

  
 Carrie Lee Riggins
 Danielle Rowe
 Drew Jacoby
 Gabrielle Lamb
 Melissa Barak
 Rachel Sherak
 Wendy Whelan

 Andrew Crawford
 Edwaard Liang
 Juan Pablo Ledo
 Lucas Segovia
 Matthew Prescott
 Rory Hohenstein
 Rubinald Pronk
 Ty Gurfein

Reviews 

 Village Voice by Deborah Jowitt, November 10, 2009
Sulcas, Roslyn, 2009, "New Troupe Faces a Hard Reality," International Herald Tribune, October 24–25, pp. 15 & 19.

Footnotes

References 
 Playbill, City Center, October 1 and 4, 2008

External links 
Morphoses, official website
City Center, official website
Sadler's Wells, official website
Morphoses on the Sadler's Wells website
Vail International Dance Festival: Morphoses dancer bios
Archival footage of Morphoses performing at the Jacob's Pillow Dance Festival in 2012

Ballet companies in the United States
Lists of ballets by company
2007 establishments in the United States
Performing groups established in 2007